The Malmberget mine (Swedish: Malmbergsgruvan) is one of the largest iron ore mines in Sweden. The mine is located in Malmberget in Norrbotten County, Lapland. The mine which is owned by Luossavaara-Kiirunavaara AB (LKAB) has an annual production capacity of over 5 million tonnes of iron ore. The mine has reserves amounting to 350 million tonnes of ore grading 43.8% iron thus resulting 153.3 million tonnes of iron. In 2009 the mine produced 4.3 million tonnes of iron. It is one of the largest underground mines for iron ore in the world.

The new main level is located at 1250 meter, while the deepest point is 1390 meter below ground.

The iron-apatite ore of the mine is hosted in igneous rocks known as the Kiruna Porphyry.

References

Iron mines in Sweden